Flamingos FC is a Namibian football club from Rehoboth. They play in the country's highest division, the Namibia Premier League.

The team was founded in 1986 by brothers Tossy and Alex Strauss. The club were promoted to the First Division Southern Stream from the Hardap Regional Division in 2014. Flamingos won promotion to the top-flight Namibia Premier League in their very first season in the second tier.

Flamingo Promoted To The Top Flight.

League participations
Namibia Premier League: 2015–
Namibia First Division: 2014–15
Regional Leagues 1986–2014

References

External links

Football clubs in Namibia
Association football clubs established in 1986
1986 establishments in South West Africa